Nikolay Florea (Floria) (October 19, 1912, Odessa Ukraine – October 1941, Vyazma, Russia) was a Soviet astronomer of mixed Romanian and Russian origin.

Biography 
Florea was born in Odessa in the village of Moldovanca, where many people of Romanian origin have lived since the Middle Ages. His father was a teacher of Latin language. The young Nikolay (Nicolae) was interested in astronomy and begun amateur observations of variable stars at the popular astronomical observatory in that city. After the finish of the school and astronomical department of the University He was employed as astronomer in Tashkent (Uzbekistan), while subsequently He was transferred to the Shternberg Astronomical Institute of the Moscow State University. He was a scientific secretary of the "Astronomicheskii Zhurnal".

Prior the beginning of the War (22 June 1941) he finished the 1-st part of his doctoral work. After the beginning of the War he was a volunteer and participated in the battles near the town of Vyazma 200 km southwest from Moscow. He died in October 1941. Nikolay Florea (Floria) is the father of Russian historian and Slavist, corresponding member of the Russian Academy of Sciences, Boris Florea (Floria).

Publications 
 ADS NASA

About him 
 Gaina Alex, While the candle burns.... Faclia (General News, P7360, Chisinau The Republic of Moldova), 10 August 1995. (Romanian title: Palpaind o flacaruie...)
 Gaina Alex, Nicolae Florea. Foaie Matematica (Chisinau, The Republic of Moldova), No 2 (2001) (Romanian title: Nicolae Florea)
 Gaina Alex: Verochka Zingan and recollections about the Physics deprtament of the Moscow University. Part 3: The last courses ГОСТИННАЯ: форум: Gaina Alex: Verochka Zingan and recollections about the Physics Departament of the Moscow University. Part 3: The last courses (in Russian)

1912 births
1941 deaths
Soviet astronomers
Scientists from Odesa
Soviet people of Romanian descent
Soviet military personnel killed in World War II